Refuge Mont-Blanc (also Rifugio Monte Bianco) is a low-altitude refuge in the Alps in Val Veny, near Courmayeur, Italy.
Despite its name, it is not used by climbers attempting to reach the summits of the Mont Blanc massif, but its location close to the valley bottom of Val Veny allows it  to accommodate walkers undertaking the Tour du Mont Blanc, or winter skiers using the Courmayeur ski resort. It can be reached by car from Courmayeur.

Ascents
Mont Chétif - 2343 meters
Col Checrouit - 1956 meters
Pre de Pascal - 1912 meters

External links
Refuge location on French IGN mapping portal
Official site

Mountain huts in the Alps
Mountain huts in Italy
Courmayeur